The 2023 Big 12 Conference softball tournament, will be the 19th edition of the Big 12 Conference softball tournament, the annual softball championship organised by the Big 12 Conference. The USA Softball Hall of Fame Stadium in Oklahoma City, Oklahoma will host the tournament, which is scheduled to take place from May 11 to May 13, 2023. The tournament winner will earn the league's automatic bid to the 2023 NCAA Division I softball tournament.

Format
All seven teams will be seeded based on conference winning percentage. They then will play a single-elimination tournament, with the top seed receiving a single bye.

Bracket

Schedule

References

Tournament
Big 12 Conference softball tournament
Big 12